Philip Shute (born 15 December 1953) is an English former footballer who played as a forward in the Football League on a non-contract basis for Darlington, and in non-league football for Shildon and Darlington Cleveland Bridge. He was born in Darlington, County Durham.

References

1953 births
Living people
Footballers from Darlington
English footballers
Association football forwards
Shildon A.F.C. players
Darlington F.C. players
Darlington Cleveland Bridge F.C. players
English Football League players